Uncle Meat is a film written and directed by Frank Zappa, released direct-to-video in 1987. Principal photography having never been completed, the videocassette is a "making of" documentary showing rehearsals and background footage from 1968 and interviews with people involved with the uncompleted production. The video has not yet been released on DVD.

Cast (in alphabetical order)
Phyllis Smith Altenhaus as herself/Sheba Flieschman (as Phyllis Altenhaus)
Dick Barber as himself
Massimo Bassoli as Adult Minnesota Tishman
Rodney Bingenheimer as himself
Jimmy Carl Black as himself
Ray Collins as himself/Bill Yards
Aynsley Dunbar as himself/Biff Junior
Roy Estrada as himself
Francesca Fisher as The Countess
Bunk Gardner as himself
Buzz Gardner as himself
Lowell George as himself
Dick Kunc as himself
Manfred Lerch as himself
C. Mercedes Lewis as Girl Who Was A Sofa
Sal Lombardo as himself
Meredith Monk as Red Face Girl
Billy Mundi as Rollo
Janet Neville-Ferguson as herself
Don Preston as himself/Biff Debris/Uncle Meat
Fritz Rau as himself
Linda Ronstadt as herself
Cal Schenkel as himself
Euclid James 'Motorhead' Sherwood as himself
Stumuk as Elderly Biff Debris
Arthur Dyer Tripp III as himself
Ian Underwood as himself
Haskell Wexler as himself
Tom Wilson as himself
Annie Zannas as herself
Carl Zappa as Young Minnesota Tishman
Frank Zappa as himself/The Imaginary Director

See also
Uncle Meat - an album by The Mothers of Invention

External links

1987 direct-to-video films
1987 comedy films
1987 documentary films
1987 films
1980s musical films
1980s science fiction films
American comedy films
American documentary films
Films directed by Frank Zappa
Films scored by Frank Zappa
Films set in 1968
1980s English-language films
1980s American films